The list of shipwrecks in 1817 includes ships sunk, wrecked or otherwise lost during 1817.

January

1 January

2 January

4 January

5 January

6 January

7 January

8 January

9 January

10 January

12 January

13 January

14 January

15 January

16 January

17 January

18 January

19 January

20 January

21 January

22 January

23 January

24 January

25 January

26 January

27 January

28 January

29 January

31 January

Unknown date

February

3 February

4 February

5 February

6 February

7 February

8 February

9 February

10 February

11 February

12 February

13 February

15 February

16 February

17 February

18 February

19 February

20 February

22 February

23 February

24 February

25 February

27 February

28 February

Unknown date

March

1 March

2 March

3 March

4 March

5 March

6 March

7 March

8 March

10 March

11 March

12 March

13 March

15 March

18 March

19 March

20 March

21 March

22 March

23 March

24 March

25 March

26 March

27 March

29 March

31 March

Unknown date

April

4 April

6 April

7 April

9 April

10 April

14 April

15 April

16 April

17 April

18 April

19 April

20 April

24 April

25 April

26 April

28 April

29 April

Unknown date

May

4 May

5 May

6 May

7 May

8 May

9 May

10 May

13 May

14 May

19 May

23 May

24 May

26 May

28 May

29 May

30 May

Unknown date

June

1 June

3 June

4 June

5 June

6 June

7 June

8 June

9 June

11 June

12 June

13 June

14 June

15 June

18 June

20 June

22 June

23 June

24 June

29 June

Unknown date

July

1 July

2 July

3 July

4 July

5 July

6 July

8 July

10 July

13 July

14 July

15 July

16 July

25 July

28 July

29 July

Unknown Date

August

1 August

2 August

3 August

5 August

6 August

7 August

8 August

10 August

12 August

13 August

14 August

15 August

17 August

18 August

19 August

21 August

22 August

23 August

24 August

25 August

26 August

27 August

29 August

30 August

31 August

Unknown date

September

2 September

3 September

4 September

6 September

8 September

11 September

13 September

14 September

16 September

17 September

18 September

19 September

22 September

24 September

26 September

27 September

28 September

29 September

30 September

Unknown date

October

1 October

2 October

3 October

4 October

5 October

6 October

7 October

9 October

10 October

11 October

12 October

13 October

14 October

15 October

16 October

17 October

18 October

19 October

20 October

21 October

22 October

23 October

25 October

26 October

27 October

29 October

30 October

31 October

Unknown date

November

1 November

2 November

3 November

4 November

5 November

6 November

7 November

8 November

9 November

11 November

12 November

13 November

14 November

15 November

16 November

17 November

18 November

19 November

20 November

21 November

22 November

23 November

24 November

25 November

26 November

27 November

28 November

29 November

30 November

Unknown date

December

1 December

3 December

4 December

5 December

6 December

7 December

8 December

9 December

10 December

11 December

12 December

13 December

14 December

15 December

16 December

17 December

18 December

19 December

20 December

21 December

22 December

23 December

24 December

26 December

27 December

28 December

31 December

Unknown date

Unknown date

References

1817